Gurteen College is an agricultural college in County Tipperary, Ireland. Founded as Gurteen Agricultural College by the Methodist Church in Ireland in 1947 it was officially opened by the Minister for Agriculture, Mr Patrick Smith, on October 11, 1947. The college provides training courses in agriculture and equine studies for farms and rural enterprises. It is a charity registered in Ireland. The farm covers 380 hectares of land.

Courses
Courses provided in Agriculture in Crops & Machinery Management, Dairy Herd Management, and Drystock Herd Management. The  Teagasc Green Cert. is also available. The Equine department opened in 1999. A Higher Certificate and a bachelor's degree are available from Gurteen in conjunction with Athlone Institute of Technology. Also offered in association with Athlone IT is the Bachelor of Science (Veterinary Nursing). Limerick Institute of Technology (LIT) offers a BSc degree in Environmental Management in Agriculture, in co-operation with Gurteen College.

Latest developments
Gurteen college students were crowned Annual Colleges Challenge Day Champions on 2 February 2012.

Wood -chip boilers were installed to provide heat in September 2010. Groves of willow will provide fuel for the boilers from 2013.

Met Éireann opened an automatic weather station in 2008 within the grounds of the College.

On 26 January 2010 a 50 kW wind turbine was officially commissioned to provide power to the college.

Past pupils
Simon Coveney, Irish politician and government minister
Tom Parlon, Irish lobbyist, former president of the Irish Farmers' Association, and a former politician
Noel Treacy, former Irish politician
Ivan Yates, Irish businessman, broadcaster, and former politician (he served as Minister of Agriculture)

Principals
Jon Parry was appointed principal in 2019, the college's sixth principal succeeding Mick Pearson who served as principal for twenty years. Rev. James Wesley McKinney was first Principal in 1947 until he retired in 1959, when Rev. R. G. Livingstone became principal. Mr. Oscar H. Loane became principal in 1963 serving until 1988 when John Craig became principal, retiring in 2000.

References

External links

Education in County Tipperary
Educational institutions established in 1947
Agricultural universities and colleges in Ireland
Further education colleges in the Republic of Ireland
1947 establishments in Ireland
Methodist Church in Ireland
Protestant buildings and structures in the Republic of Ireland